David Leray (born 2 March 1984 in Saint-Père-en-Retz) is a French footballer, who currently plays for SO Cholet.

The defender played previously for St Pierre de Retz Sporting, L'Eclair De Chauve in the youth side and professionally for FC Nantes,  Tours, Angers SCO and ASR Machecoul.

Notess

1984 births
Living people
French footballers
Association football defenders
Ligue 1 players
Ligue 2 players
FC Nantes players
Tours FC players
Angers SCO players
Footballers from Loire-Atlantique